The 2014 AMNRL season is the 17th season of the American National Rugby League.  The league shrunk from six to five teams following the Northern Virginia Eagles movement to the USARL. The season was eventually canceled.

Teams

References

American National Rugby League seasons
2014 in rugby league
2014 in American sports